This is a list of Brazilian federative units by homicide rate, according to data from the Atlas da Violência (years 1996 to 2021, prepared by the Instituto de Pesquisa Econômica Aplicada (Ipea) and the Fórum Brasileiro de Segurança Pública (FBSP) and the Mapa da Violência from 1998 (1980s to 1988 ) and 2000 (years 1989 to 1995, prepared by United Nations Educational Organization, Science and Culture (UNESCO).

List

The 2000s and 2020s 
The list of decades, by default, is ordered by homicide rate in a decreasing manner according to 2021. That is, the federative units with the highest rates this year are closer to the top of the list.

Decades of 1980 and 1990

See also
 Crime in Brazil
 List of cities by murder rate
 Homicide in world cities
 List of countries by firearm-related death rate
List of Brazilian states

References

 Crime in Brazil
Murder in Brazil
Brazil
Murder rate
Brazil, Murder